Henry Beagley (born 7 January 1805) was an English professional cricketer who played first-class cricket from 1825 to 1833.  He was a brother of Thomas Beagley and an occasional wicket-keeper who was mainly associated with Hampshire.  He made 6 known appearances in first-class matches including 3 for The Bs from 1825 to 1832.

References

1805 births
Date of death unknown
English cricketers
English cricketers of 1787 to 1825
English cricketers of 1826 to 1863
Hampshire cricketers
Year of death missing
People from Alton, Hampshire
Players cricketers
The Bs cricketers
Non-international England cricketers